Darryl "Slip" Sly (April 3, 1939 – August 28, 2007) was a Canadian  ice hockey player who played 79 games in the National Hockey League with the Vancouver Canucks, Toronto Maple Leafs and Minnesota North Stars. He also played parts of 11 seasons with the minor league Rochester Americans (AHL), and seven seasons with the Barrie Flyers (OHA). Internationally Sly played for Canada at the 1960 Winter Olympics, where he won a silver medal, and the 1961 World Championship, where he won gold.

Don Cherry referenced Darryl Sly on the 01 Mar 14 edition of Coach's Corner saying, "just like me and Darryl Sly used to" regarding playing a staggered D as opposed to side by side when a forward is coming in one-on-two.  On the 7 June 14 edition of Coach's Corner, Cherry stated that Sly "carried me for six years" when talking about the importance of defensive pairings staying together over their careers.

He died on 28 August 2007 at the age of 68.

Career statistics

Regular season and playoffs

International

References

External links

Obituary at LostHockey.com

1939 births
2007 deaths
Canadian ice hockey defencemen
Ice hockey people from Simcoe County
Ice hockey players at the 1960 Winter Olympics
Iowa Stars (CHL) players
Medalists at the 1960 Winter Olympics
Minnesota North Stars players
Olympic ice hockey players of Canada
Olympic medalists in ice hockey
Olympic silver medalists for Canada
Sportspeople from Collingwood, Ontario
Rochester Americans players
Toronto Maple Leafs players
Toronto St. Michael's Majors players
Vancouver Canucks players
Vancouver Canucks (WHL) players
Western International Hockey League players